Vacherin may refer to: 

Vacherin Mont d'Or, a soft cheese made in France and Switzerland
Vacherin Fribourgeois, a semi-hard cheese made in Switzerland

See also
 Vacheron
 Vacherie